Savay Farm is a Grade I listed 12th century farmhouse at The Savay, Denham, Buckinghamshire, England.

The house has a timber frame and red brick nogging.

It was granted Grade I status in September 1955, protecting it from unauthorised alteration or demolition.

Past owners have included the Derdent Family, after whom the house was once named, Lieutenant General Gerald Goodlake VC, and Sir Oswald Mosley.

, the house is in private ownership.

References

Further reading 

 
 

Grade I listed houses
Grade I listed buildings in Buckinghamshire
Denham, Buckinghamshire
14th-century architecture in the United Kingdom
Timber framed buildings in England